Dontario Tyron Drummond (born August 22, 1997) is an American football wide receiver for the Dallas Cowboys of the National Football League (NFL). He played college football at East Mississippi Community College before transferring to Ole Miss and was signed by the Cowboys as an undrafted free agent at the end of the 2022 NFL Draft.

Early life and high school
Drummond grew up in Laurel, Mississippi, and attended Laurel High School. While in high school, he played baseball and basketball, as well as football, winning state championships with both his football and basketball teams. In four years in high school, Drummond accounted for 3474 all-purpose yards, and was a 3-star prospect.

College career

East Mississippi CC
Drummond began his college career at East Mississippi Community College in Scooba, Mississippi. As a sophomore, he was named NJCAA All-American  and led East Mississippi to the junior college national championships in 2017 and 2018. In two years at East Mississippi, he totaled 95 receptions, 1466 receiving yards, and 21 touchdowns.

Ole Miss
After two years at East Mississippi, Drummond transferred to Ole Miss. In his first year at Ole Miss, he finished third on the team with 13 receptions for 188 yards. In his junior season, Drummond caught 25 passes for 417 yards and seven touchdowns, helping Ole Miss to the 2021 Outback Bowl. In his senior year, he broke out, recording 76 receptions for 1028 yards and 8 touchdowns, including a career high 177 yards against Louisville in the season opener.

College statistics

Professional career

Drummond signed with the Dallas Cowboys as an undrafted free agent on May 3, 2022. He was waived on August 30, 2022 and signed to the practice squad the next day. He signed a reserve/future contract on January 23, 2023.

References

External links
 Dallas Cowboys bio
East Mississippi Lions bio
Ole Miss Rebels bio

1997 births
Living people
American football wide receivers
Dallas Cowboys players
East Mississippi Lions football players
Ole Miss Rebels football players
People from Laurel, Mississippi
Players of American football from Mississippi